Mirza ghassemi or mirza qassemi (Persian: میرزا قاسمی) is an Iranian appetizer or main based on tandoori or grilled aubergine (eggplant), distinct to the Northern Iran and Caspian Sea region (specifically Gilan province). It is known as Persian eggplant dip in Western countries.

The dish consists of aubergines seasoned with garlic, tomato, oil or butter, salt and pepper bound together with eggs. It can be prepared as a casserole dish, and is usually served with bread or rice. The variant made with zucchini instead of aubergine is called Kadoo Ghasemi.

Etymology  
Mirza ghasemi was invented by Mohammad Qasim Khan, the governor of Rasht during the reign of Nasser al-Din Shah (1848-1896), and was developed by him and named after him.

See also
 Eggplant salads and appetizers
 List of casserole dishes
 List of egg dishes
 Kashk e bademjan, another popular Iranian eggplant dish
 Baba ghanoush, a Levantine eggplant dish 
 Baingan bharta, a South Asian eggplant dish

References

Iranian cuisine
Appetizers
Eggplant dishes
Casserole dishes
Vegetarian dishes of Iran